"Into Oblivion (Reunion)" is the opening track, and first single, from Funeral for a Friend's album, Tales Don't Tell Themselves. It was a single released on 7 May 2007 reaching number 16 in the UK charts in its first week. The album followed on May 14. The song debuted on The Zane Lowe rock show on 19 March 2007 and the official music video was uploaded to the band's MySpace page shortly after. It was nominated for the Kerrang! Award for Best Single. The song was once featured on Coronation Street, with David Platt sat in his car listening to the song.

Music video 
The video features the band playing in a dark studio, with a large screen behind them. As the screen plays, it shows various scenes of seas during a storm (in keeping with the concept album's theme). Later, the studio suddenly begins to rain heavily, soaking all the band members.

Track listing 
The track listing for the various release formats was announced through a bulletin posted on MySpace on 27 April 2007.

CD (ATUK058CD):
 Into Oblivion (Reunion) - Radio Edit
 Rise and Fall

7" coloured vinyl / gatefold sleeve (ATUK058):
 Into Oblivion (Reunion)
 Out of Reach (Demo)

7" shaped picture disc (ATUK058X):
 Into Oblivion (Reunion)
 Crash and Burn (Demo)

7p UK Digital Store Version:
 Into Oblivion (Reunion)
 Into Oblivion (Reunion) [Unmastered Demo]
 Band Album Commentary: Part 1
 Band Album Commentary: Part 2
 Collection of 6, 30 second album clips

Promos 
Both a CD and a DVD have been released as promos for this single. The CD contains the Radio Edit of Into Oblivion (Reunion) and the DVD has the promo music video for the single.

External links
 Funeral for a Friend's MySpace

Funeral for a Friend songs
2007 singles
Wikipedia requested audio of songs
2007 songs
Atlantic Records singles